Denizciler (literally "Seamen") is a town in İskenderun district of Hatay Province, Turkey. It is on Turkish state highway  which connects İskenderun to north. The population is of Denizciler was 17925  as of 2012. Denizciler is a recent town. It was formed by merging several settlements in 1987. There are several civil and military offices and small ports in and around Denizciler, the most important one being Isdemir a major steel producer situated to the north of Denziciler. Thus services in and around the town constitute the main revenue of the town. Denizciler is also popular with the retired people

References

Populated places in Hatay Province
Towns in Turkey
İskenderun District
Populated coastal places in Turkey